Lilburn is a city in Gwinnett County, Georgia, United States. The population was 14,502 at the 2020 census. The estimated population was 12,810 in 2019. It is a part of the Atlanta metropolitan area.

Geography
Lilburn is located in western Gwinnett County at  (33.888853, -84.140897). U.S. Route 29 (Lawrenceville Highway) passes through the center of town, leading southwest  to downtown Atlanta and northeast  to Lawrenceville, the Gwinnett County seat.

Transportation

Major roads

  State Route 8
  U.S. Route 29
  State Route 378

Pedestrians and cycling

 Camp Creek Greenway
 Norcross-Lilburn Trail (Proposed)

Historical background
The city of Lilburn was founded in 1890 by the Seaboard Air Line Railway. The area previously known as "McDaniel" was renamed "Lilburn", after the general superintendent of the railroad, Lilburn Trigg Myers of Virginia. (The basis of the name change got no official mention at the time, and historical researchers did not confirm the specific link to Myers until the 1990s.) The town prospered and was incorporated as Lilburn on July 27, 1910.

A devastating fire and hard economic times in the 1920s ended the prosperity. A revitalization of the original historic area has emerged with shopping and restaurants in the Old Town district which has been described as a "slice of history."

Demographics

2020 census

As of the 2020 United States census, there were 14,502 people, 3,807 households, and 2,873 families residing in the city.

2010 census
As of 2010 Lilburn had a population of 11,596. The median age was 36.3. The racial and ethnic composition of the population was 52.7% white (34.3% non-Hispanic white), 24.4% black or African American, 0.5% Native American, 0.8% Asian Indian, 0.4% other Asian, 5.3% from some other race (0.3% non-Hispanic from some other race) and 2.8% from two or more races.  27.4% of the population was Hispanic or Latino.

2000 census
As of the census of 2000, there were 11,307 people, 3,943 households, and 2,835 families residing in the city. The racial makeup of the city was 69.09% White, 11.93% African American, 0.34% Native American, 11.69% Asian, 0.03% Pacific Islander, 4.81% from other races, and 2.11% from two or more races. Hispanic or Latino people of any race were 13.22% of the population.

There were 3,943 households, out of which 38.1% had children under the age of 18 living with them, 57.1% were married couples living together, 7.1% had a female householder with no husband present, and 28.1% were non-families. 0.4% of all households were made up of individuals, and 6.3% had someone living alone who was 65 years of age or older.  The average household size was 2.80 and the average family size was 3.28.

In the city, the population was spread out, with 25.7% under the age of 18, 9.1% from 18 to 24, 33.7% from 25 to 44, 23.3% from 45 to 64, and 8.3% who were 65 years of age or older.  The median age was 35 years. For every 100 females, there were 97.1 males.  For every 100 females age 18 and over, there were 92.5 males.

The median income for a household in the city was $53,707, and the median income for a family was $62,563. Males had a median income of $38,289 versus $28,996 for females. The per capita income for the city was $22,503.  About 4.7% of families and 6.1% of the population were below the poverty line, including 7.1% of those under age 18 and 10.7% of those age 65 or over.

Education

Primary and secondary schools

Public schools
Gwinnett County Public Schools operates public schools.

The following have Lilburn addresses:

Elementary schools
 Arcado Elementary (Parkview)
 Camp Creek Elementary (Parkview)
 G.H. Hopkins Elementary (Meadowcreek)
 Knight Elementary (Parkview)
 Lilburn Elementary (Meadowcreek)
 Mountain Park Elementary (Parkview)
 R.D. Head Elementary (Brookwood)
 Rebecca Minor Elementary (Berkmar)

Middle schools
 Berkmar Middle School (Berkmar)
 Five Forks Middle School (Brookwood)
 Lilburn Middle School (Meadowcreek)
 Trickum Middle School (Parkview)

High schools
 Berkmar High School (Berkmar)
 Brookwood High School (Brookwood) - Snellville
 McClure Health Science High School (Meadowcreek) - Duluth
 Meadowcreek High School (Meadowcreek) - Norcross
 Parkview High School (Parkview)

Private schools
 Gwinnett College
 Killian Hill Christian School
 Parkview Christian School
 Providence Christian Academy
 Regina Caeli Academy
 St. John Neumann Regional Catholic School

Public libraries
Gwinnett County Public Library operates the Mountain Park Branch and the Lilburn Branch.

Cityscape and landmarks

Lilburn's downtown is currently undergoing a revitalization project. The city has already constructed a new city hall/library, having already rerouted Main Street's intersection with US 29.  This revitalization includes miles of walking/biking paths referred to as the Greenway Trail and the reconstruction of the historic Prohibition Trail Bridges from the early 1900s.

The BAPS Shri Swaminarayan Mandir Atlanta is located in Lilburn, approximately two miles southwest of the city center. It is the tallest building in the city and was the largest Swaminarayan temple outside of India until the Robbinsville, NJ temple opened in 2014.

Events
Lilburn Daze Arts and Crafts Festival, hosted and organized by the Lilburn Woman's Club, an affiliate of the GFWC, is celebrated on the second Saturday in October and features over 200 vendors.  This one-day event features local artisans, children's activities, live entertainment, food, hayrides, a health screening tent and a petting zoo.

The annual Christmas Parade, held on the first Saturday in December, usually features about 100 entrants marching down Main Street on a route ending at Lilburn City Park.  Proceeds from this event fund local scholarships and many other community improvement projects in the greater Lilburn area.

Notable people
 John Crist, comedian
 Blake Brettschneider, current Major League Soccer forward for D.C. United
 Kevin Cone, NFL player, Atlanta Falcons
 Jeff Francoeur, Major League Baseball player
 Sean Johnson, current Major League Soccer goalkeeper for New York City Football Club
 Kate Michael, Miss District of Columbia, 2006
 Matt Olson, Major League Baseball player
 Michael Palmer, NFL player Atlanta Falcons
 Lennon Parham, actor, writer, and comedian
 Eric Shanteau, Olympic swimmer 
 Jon Stinchcomb, football player, All American University of Georgia, NFL New Orleans Saints, Pro Bowler and Super Bowl Champion 2010
 Matt Stinchcomb, football player, All American University of Georgia, NFL Oakland Raiders and Tampa Bay Buccaneers
 Don Stone, radio GM, publisher, TV weatherman
 Matt Watkins, NHL player Phoenix Coyotes

Twin towns and sister cities
Lilburn is twinned with:
  Suva Reka, Kosovo

References

External links

 City of Lilburn official website

Cities in Georgia (U.S. state)
Cities in Gwinnett County, Georgia
Populated places established in 1890